Thailand participated in the 1951 Asian Games in New Delhi on 4–11 March 1951.

Nations at the 1951 Asian Games
1951
Asian Games